The 1967–68 NCAA University Division men's ice hockey season began in November 1967 and concluded with the 1968 NCAA Division I Men's Ice Hockey Tournament's championship game on March 16, 1968, at the Duluth Arena Auditorium in Duluth, Minnesota. This was the 21st season in which an NCAA ice hockey championship was held and is the 74th year overall where an NCAA school fielded a team.

Pennsylvania joined ECAC Hockey beginning with this season.

Regular season

Season tournaments

Standings

1968 NCAA Tournament

Note: * denotes overtime period(s)

Player stats

Scoring leaders

The following players led the league in points at the conclusion of the season.

  
GP = Games played; G = Goals; A = Assists; Pts = Points; PIM = Penalty minutes

Leading goaltenders

The following goaltenders led the league in goals against average at the end of the regular season while playing at least 33% of their team's total minutes.

GP = Games played; Min = Minutes played; W = Wins; L = Losses; OT = Overtime/shootout losses; GA = Goals against; SO = Shutouts; SV% = Save percentage; GAA = Goals against average

Awards

NCAA

ECAC

WCHA

See also
 1967–68 NCAA College Division men's ice hockey season

References

External links
College Hockey Historical Archives
1967–68 NCAA Standings

 
NCAA